Now That's What I Call Music! 16 may refer to at least two different Now That's What I Call Music!-series albums, including

 Now That's What I Call Music 16 (U.K. series), released December 2, 1989
 Now That's What I Call Music! 16 (U.S. series), released July 27, 2004